Cephalotaxus hainanensis is a species of conifer known by the common name Hainan plum-yew. It is endemic to the island of Hainan in southern China. It is possibly a synonym of Cephalotaxus mannii.

This species grows in warmer temperate and subtropical rainforest habitat. When mature it is a tree 10 to 20 meters tall. It is sometimes a dominant species in the local ecosystem.

C. hainanensis is suggested to have antileukemia activity, and is widely used as an herbal remedy in China. Exploitation of the bark and leaves is a potential threat to this species. Logging has historically been a cause of its decline, but as logging is no longer allowed on Hainan, much of the pressure is currently from illegal harvesting for Chinese remedies.

References

Trees of China
Endemic flora of China
hainanensis
Endangered plants
Plants described in 1953